Thorsten Ott (born 18 June 1973) is a German former footballer. After playing as a youth with Kickers Offenbach, he joined Bayern Munich as an 18-year-old, and was thrown into the first team in August 1991, replacing Michael Sternkopf in a 2–0 home defeat against VfL Bochum. This was to be his only appearance for Bayern, though, and after two years in the reserve team, he left the club, moving into amateur football.

References

External links

1973 births
Living people
German footballers
FC Bayern Munich II players
FC Bayern Munich footballers
SV Wehen Wiesbaden players
Bundesliga players
Association football midfielders
Association football forwards